Carole Keyes (born 2 September 1952) is a Canadian luger. She competed at the 1976 Winter Olympics, the 1980 Winter Olympics and the 1984 Winter Olympics.

References

1952 births
Living people
Canadian female lugers
Olympic lugers of Canada
Lugers at the 1976 Winter Olympics
Lugers at the 1980 Winter Olympics
Lugers at the 1984 Winter Olympics
People from Woodstock, New Brunswick
Sportspeople from New Brunswick